Zachary Green (born March 7, 1994) is an American professional baseball infielder who is a free agent. He was drafted by the Philadelphia Phillies in the 3rd round of the 2012 MLB draft.  He has played in Major League Baseball (MLB) for the San Francisco Giants, with whom he made his MLB debut in 2019.

Career
Green attended Jesuit High School in Carmichael, California.

Philadelphia Phillies
He was drafted by the Philadelphia Phillies in the 3rd round, with the 125th overall selection, of the 2012 MLB draft, and signed for a $420,000 signing bonus.  

In 2012, Green played for the Gulf Coast Phillies, hitting .284/.333/.426/.759 with 3 home runs and 21 RBIs. In 2013, he played for the Williamsport Crosscutters, hitting .252/.344/.478/.822 with 13 home runs and 41 RBI. He spent the 2014 season with the Lakewood BlueClaws, hitting .268/.316/.402/.718 with 6 home runs and 43 RBI. He spent the 2015 season with the Clearwater Threshers, hitting .173/.216/.221/.437 with 1 home run and 7 RBI, in just 26 games due to a wrist injury. He returned to Clearwater in the 2016 season, hitting .263/.326/.432/.758 with 12 home runs and 63 RBI. In the 2016 season, he played through pain that was resolved by undergoing Tommy John surgery and a surgery to fix a hip ailment. He split the 2017 season between the GCL Phillies, Clearwater, and the Reading Fightin Phils, hitting a combined .227/.291/.424/.715 with 9 home runs and 26 RBI. His 2018 season was split between Reading and the Lehigh Valley IronPigs, hitting a combined .281/.356/.532/.888 with 20 home runs and 75 RBI.

San Francisco Giants
Green became a free agent following the 2018 season, and signed a minor league contract with the San Francisco Giants on January 24, 2019. He opened the 2019 season with the Sacramento River Cats, for whom he batted .282/.380/.659 with 25 home runs and 64 RBIs in 252 at bats.

On July 21, 2019, the Giants selected Green's contract and promoted him to the major leagues. He made his major league debut that day versus the New York Mets. Green was outrighted off the Giants roster on November 4, 2019, and re-signed with the team on a minor league contract. He became a free agent on November 2, 2020.

Milwaukee Brewers
On December 3, 2020, Green signed a minor league contract with the Milwaukee Brewers organization. In 2021, Green spent the year with the Triple-A Nashville Sounds, slashing .214/.310/.407 with 15 home runs and 64 RBI in 101 games with the team. Green elected free agency following the season on November 7, 2021.

Seattle Mariners
On March 16, 2022, Green signed a minor league contract with the Seattle Mariners organization. He elected free agency on November 10, 2022.

References

External links

1994 births
Living people
People from Carmichael, California
Baseball players from California
Major League Baseball infielders
San Francisco Giants players
Florida Complex League Phillies players
Williamsport Crosscutters players
Lakewood BlueClaws players
Clearwater Threshers players
Reading Fightin Phils players
Glendale Desert Dogs players
Lehigh Valley IronPigs players
Sacramento River Cats players
Nashville Sounds players
Tacoma Rainiers players